Initiation is a 1987 Australian adventure drama thriller film directed by Michael Pearce based on his idea and starring Bruno Lawrence and Rodney Harvey.

Plot synopsis
Teenager Danny Molloy visits his father Nat on a lonesome farm in Australia after the death of his mother, who lives with a girlfriend and her daughter Stevie. Because work on the farm isn't going well, Nat begins to smuggle marijuana for a drug connection and so Danny catches a flight with him, only for the plane to crash in the middle of nowhere. Since his father is wounded, Danny has to search for help alone in the jungle.

Cast
Rodney Harvey as Danny Molloy
Bruno Lawrence as Nat Molloy
Miranda Otto as Stevie
Arna-Maria Winchester as Sal
Bobby Smith as Kulu
Tony Barry as Pat
Luciano Catenacci as Carlo

Production
The film was shot in Adelaide and the Blue Mountains. It was completed in January 1987.

Release
The film was pre-sold to US distributor Goldfarb for $850,000 but Goldfarb later backed out of this commitment claiming they did not have the money.

Accolades
Bobby Smith was nominated for Best Supporting Actor at the 1987 AFI Awards.

References

External links

Initiation at Oz Movies

Australian adventure drama films
1980s English-language films
1980s Australian films